The tournament in New Delhi was a new addition to the ITF Women's Circuit.

Liu Chang and Lu Jiajing won the title, defeating Marina Melnikova and Elise Mertens in the final, 6–3, 6–0.

Seeds

Draw

References 
 Draw

QNet Open - Doubles